Loch Broom ("loch of rain showers") is a sea loch located in northwestern Ross and Cromarty, in the former parish of Lochbroom, on the west coast of Scotland. The small town of Ullapool lies on the eastern shore of the loch.

Little Loch Broom
Its sister loch, Little Loch Broom ("the little loch"), lies just to the west, at the foot of An Teallach and opening into the Minch. The village of Dundonnell is located at the mouth of the loch, linked by the A832 coast road to Camusnagaul on the eastern shore, midway up the loch, and Badcaul further north. The loch is an important wildlife habitat, and a population of cormorants often bask on the rocks jutting out of the water.

Geography

Loch Broom
Loch Broom is fed by the River Broom which rises in the Dirrie mountains, issuing from two lochs: Loch Bhraoin and Loch Droma. Loch Broom feeds the River Cuileig, which is joined by the Allt Breabaig stream that rises in Sgùrr Breac to the south. Loch Droma feeds the river Droma.

It ramifies into Loch Broom proper in the North, with the sea loch, Loch Kanaird to the northeast close to Isle Martin, which overlooks Annat Bay on the Scoraig peninsula to the west which separates Loch Broom from Little Loch Broom in the middle and Gruinard Bay in the South.

Little Loch Broom

Mountains
The peninsula separating Loch Broom from Little Loch Broom contains the mountains of Beinn Ghobhlach and Beinn nam Ban. It has a commanding view of Gruinard Bay and Gruinard Island to the west.

These summits of An Teallach are thus Marilyns.

References

Broom
Broom
Ross and Cromarty